The following is the list of players in the Australian Football League (AFL) who have either made their AFL debut or played for a new club during the 2017 AFL season.

Summary

AFL debuts

Change of AFL club

References
Full listing of players who made their AFL or club debut in 2017

Australian rules football records and statistics
Australian rules football-related lists
Debut